The Phanerozoic Eon is the current geologic eon in the geologic time scale, and the one during which abundant animal and plant life has existed. It covers 538.8 million years to the present, and it began with the Cambrian Period, when animals first developed hard shells preserved in the fossil record. The time before the Phanerozoic, called the Precambrian, is now divided into the Hadean, Archaean and Proterozoic eons.

The time span of the Phanerozoic starts with the sudden appearance of fossilised evidence of a number of animal phyla; the evolution of those phyla into diverse forms; the emergence and development of complex plants; the evolution of fish; the emergence of insects and tetrapods; and the development of modern fauna. Plant life on land appeared in the early Phanerozoic eon. During this time span, tectonic forces which move the continents had collected them into a single landmass known as Pangaea (the most recent supercontinent), which then separated into the current continental landmasses.

Etymology 
The term "Phanerozoic" was coined in 1930 by the American geologist George Halcott Chadwick (1876–1953).

Proterozoic-Phanerozoic boundary

The Proterozoic-Phanerozoic boundary is at 538.8 million years ago. In the 19th century, the boundary was set at time of appearance of the first abundant animal (metazoan) fossils but several hundred groups (taxa) of metazoa of the preceding Proterozoic eon have been identified since the systematic study of those forms started in the 1950s.

Eras of the Phanerozoic
The Phanerozoic is divided into three eras: the Paleozoic, Mesozoic, and Cenozoic, which are further subdivided into 12 periods. The Paleozoic features the evolution of fish, amphibians and reptiles. The Mesozoic features the evolution of lizards, crocodiles, snakes, turtles, mammals, and dinosaurs (including birds). The Cenozoic begins with the extinction of the non-avian dinosaurs, and features evolution of great diversity in birds and mammals. Humans appeared and evolved during the most recent part of the Cenozoic.

Paleozoic Era

The Paleozoic is a time in Earth's history when complex life forms evolved, took their first breath of oxygen on dry land, and when the forerunners of all multicelular life on Earth began to diversify. There are six periods in the Paleozoic era: Cambrian, Ordovician, Silurian, Devonian, Carboniferous and Permian.

Cambrian Period
The Cambrian is the first period of the Paleozoic Era and ran from 539 million to 485 million years ago. The Cambrian sparked a rapid expansion in the diversity of animals, in an event known as the Cambrian explosion, during which the greatest number of animal body plans evolved in a single period in the history of Earth. Complex algae evolved, and the fauna was dominated by armoured arthropods, such as trilobites. Almost all phyla of marine animals evolved in this period. During this time, the super-continent Pannotia began to break up, most of which later recombined into the super-continent Gondwana.

Ordovician Period

The Ordovician spans from 485 million to 444 million years ago. The Ordovician was a time in Earth's history in which many groups still prevalent today evolved or diversified, such as primitive cephalopods, fish, and corals. This process is known as the Great Ordovician Biodiversification Event, or GOBE. Trilobites began to be replaced by articulate brachiopods, and crinoids also became an increasingly important part of the fauna. The first arthropods crept ashore to colonise Gondwana, a continent empty of animal life. By the end of the Ordovician, Gondwana had moved from the equator to the South Pole, and Laurentia had collided with Baltica, closing the Iapetus Ocean. The glaciation of Gondwana resulted in a major drop in sea level, killing off all life that had established along its coast. Glaciation caused an icehouse Earth, leading to the Ordovician–Silurian extinction, during which 60% of marine invertebrates and 25% of families became extinct. Though one of the deadliest mass extinctions in earth's history, the O–S extinction did not cause profound ecological changes between the periods.

Silurian Period

The Silurian spans from 444 million to 419 million years ago, which saw a warming from an icehouse Earth. This period saw the mass evolution of fish, as jawless fish became more numerous, and early jawed and freshwater fish appeared in the fossil record. Arthropods remained abundant, and some groups, such as eurypterids, became apex predators. Fully terrestrial life established itself on land, including early arachnids, fungi, and myriapods (many-legged arthropods). The evolution of vascular plants such as Cooksonia allowed plants to gain a foothold on land as well. These early terrestrial plants are the forerunners of all plant life on land. During this time, there were four continents: Gondwana (Africa, South America, Australia, Antarctica, India), Laurentia (North America with parts of Europe), Baltica (the rest of Europe), and Siberia (Northern Asia).

Devonian Period

The Devonian spans from 419 million to 359 million years ago. Also informally known as the "Age of the Fish", the Devonian features a huge diversification in fish. Armored fish included jawless "agnathans", as well as jawed placoderms such as Dunkleosteus. The Devonian also saw a diversification of modern fish groups such as chondricthyans (sharks and kin), osteichthyans (ray-finned fish), and sarcopterygians (lobe-finned fish). One lineage of sarcopterygians evolved into the first four-limbed vertebrates, which would eventually become tetrapods. On land, plant groups diversified; the first trees and seeds evolved during this period. By the Middle Devonian, shrub-like forests of early plants existed: lycophytes, horsetails, ferns, and progymnosperm. This event also allowed the diversification of arthropod life as they took advantage of the new habitat. Near the end of the Devonian, 70% of all species became extinct in a sequence of mass extinction events, collectively known as the Late Devonian extinction.

Carboniferous Period

The Carboniferous spans from 359 million to 299 million years ago. Tropical swamps dominated the Earth, and the large amounts of trees created much of the carbon that became coal deposits (hence the name Carboniferous). About 90% of all coal beds were deposited in the Carboniferous and Permian periods, which represent just 2% of the Earth's geologic history. The high oxygen levels caused by these swamps allowed massive arthropods, normally limited in size by their respiratory systems, to proliferate. Tetrapods diversified during the Carboniferous, and one lineage acquired an amniotic egg which could survive outside of the water. These tetrapods, the amniotes, included the first reptiles and synapsids (mammal relatives). Throughout the Carboniferous, there was a cooling pattern, which eventually led to the glaciation of Gondwana as much of it was situated around the south pole. This event was known as the Permo-Carboniferous Glaciation and resulted in a major loss of area for coal forests, the Carboniferous rainforest collapse.

Permian Period

The Permian spans from 298 million to 251 million years ago and was the last period of the Paleozoic era. At its beginning, all continents came together to form the super-continent Pangaea, surrounded by one ocean called Panthalassa. The Earth was relatively dry compared to the Carboniferous, with harsh seasons, as the climate of the interior of Pangaea was not moderated by large bodies of water. Amniotes flourished and diversified in the new dry climate, particularly synapsids such as Dimetrodon, Edaphosaurus, and the ancestors of modern mammals. The first conifers evolved during this period, then dominated the terrestrial landscape. The Permian ended with at least one mass extinction, the Permian-Triassic mass extinction, an event sometimes known as "the Great Dying". This extinction was the largest in earth's history and led to the loss of 95% of all species of life.

Mesozoic Era

The Mesozoic ranges from 252 million to 66 million years ago. Also referred to as the Age of Reptiles or Age of Conifers, the Mesozoic featured the appearance of many modern tetrapods, as reptiles ascended to ecological dominance over synapsids. The Mesozoic is subdivided into three periods: the Triassic, Jurassic, and Cretaceous.

Triassic Period

The Triassic ranges from 252 million to 201 million years ago. The Triassic is a transitional time in Earth's history between the Permian Extinction and the lush Jurassic Period. It has three major epochs: Early Triassic, Middle Triassic. and Late Triassic.

The Early Triassic lasted between 252 million to 247 million years ago, and was a hot and arid epoch in the aftermath of the Permian Extinction. Many tetrapods during this epoch represented a disaster fauna, a group of animals with low diversity and cosmopolitanism (wide geographic ranges). Temnospondyli recovered and rediversified into large aquatic predators during the Triassic. Reptiles also diversified rapidly, with aquatic reptiles such as ichthyosaurs and sauropterygians proliferating in the seas. On land, the first true archosaurs appeared, including pseudosuchians (crocodile relatives) and avemetatarsalians (bird/dinosaur relatives). 

The Middle Triassic spans from 247 million to 237 million years ago. The Middle Triassic featured the beginnings of the break-up of Pangaea as rifting commenced in north Pangaea. The northern part of the Tethys Ocean, the Paleotethys Ocean, had become a passive basin, but a spreading center was active in the southern part of the Tethys Ocean, the Neotethys Ocean. Phytoplankton, coral, crustaceans, and many other invertebrates recovered from the Permian extinction by the end of the Middle Triassic. Meanwhile, on land, reptiles continued to diversify, conifer forests flourished, as well as the first flies.

The Late Triassic spans from 237 million to 201 million years ago. Following the bloom of the Middle Triassic, the Late Triassic was warm and arid, with a strong monsoon climate and with most precipitation limited to coastal regions and high latitudes. The first true dinosaurs appeared early in the Late Triassic, and pterosaurs evolved a bit later. Other large reptilian competitors to the dinosaurs were wiped out by the Triassic–Jurassic extinction event, in which most archosaurs (excluding crocodylomorphs, pterosaurs, and dinosaurs), many synapsids, and almost all large amphibians became extinct, as well as 34% of marine life in the fourth mass extinction event. The cause of the extinction is debated, but likely resulted from eruptions of the CAMP large igneous province.

Jurassic Period

The Jurassic ranges from 201 million to 145 million years ago, and features three major epochs: Early Jurassic, Middle Jurassic, and Late Jurassic.

The Early Jurassic Epoch spans from 201 million to 174 million years ago. The climate was much more humid than during the Triassic, and as a result, the world was warm and partially tropical, though possibly with short colder intervals. Plesiosaurs, ichthyosaurs and ammonites dominated the seas, while dinosaurs and other reptiles dominated the land, with species such as Dilophosaurus at the apex. Crocodylomorphs evolved into aquatic forms, pushing the large amphibians to near extinction. True mammals were present during the Jurassic but remained small, with average body masses of less than  until the end of the Cretaceous.

The Middle and Late Jurassic Epochs span from 174 million to 145 million years ago. Conifer savannahs made up a large portion of the world's forests. In the oceans, plesiosaurs were quite common, and ichthyosaurs were flourishing. The Late Jurassic Epoch spans from 163 million to 145 million years ago. The Late Jurassic featured a severe extinction of sauropods in northern continents, alongside many ichthyosaurs. However, the Jurassic-Cretaceous boundary did not strongly impact most forms of life.

Cretaceous Period

The Cretaceous is the Phanerozoic's longest period, and the last period of the Mesozoic.  It spans from 145 million to 66 million years ago, and is divided into two epochs: Early Cretaceous, and Late Cretaceous. 

The Early Cretaceous Epoch spans from 145 million to 100 million years ago. Dinosaurs continued to be abundant, with groups such as tyrannosauroids, avialans (birds), marginocephalians, and ornithopods seeing early glimpses of later success. Other tetrapods, such as stegosaurs and ichthyosaurs, declined significantly, and sauropods were restricted to southern continents.

The Late Cretaceous Epoch spans from 100 million to 66 million years ago. The Late Cretaceous featured a cooling trend that would continue into the Cenozoic Era. Eventually, the tropical climate was restricted to the equator and areas beyond the tropic lines featured more seasonal climates. Dinosaurs still thrived as new species such as Tyrannosaurus, Ankylosaurus, Triceratops and hadrosaurs dominated the food web. Whether or not pterosaurs went into a decline as birds radiated is debated; however, many families survived until the end of the Cretaceous, alongside new forms such as the gigantic Quetzalcoatlus. Mammals diversified despite their small sizes, with metatherians (marsupials and kin) and eutherians (placentals and kin) coming into their own. In the oceans, mosasaurs diversified to fill the role of the now-extinct ichthyosaurs, alongside huge plesiosaurs such as Elasmosaurus. Also, the first flowering plants evolved. At the end of the Cretaceous, the Deccan Traps and other volcanic eruptions were poisoning the atmosphere. As this was continued, it is thought that a large meteor smashed into Earth, creating the Chicxulub Crater and the event known as the K–Pg extinction, the fifth and most recent mass extinction event, during which 75% of life on Earth became extinct, including all non-avian dinosaurs. Every living thing with a body mass over 10 kilograms became extinct, and the age of the dinosaurs came to an end.

Cenozoic Era

The Cenozoic featured the rise of mammals as the dominant class of animals, as the end of the age of the dinosaurs left significant open niches. There are three divisions of the Cenozoic: Paleogene, Neogene and Quaternary.

Paleogene Period

The Paleogene spans from the extinction of the non-avian dinosaurs, some 66 million years ago, to the dawn of the Neogene 23 million years ago. It features three epochs: Paleocene, Eocene and Oligocene.  

The Paleocene Epoch began with the K–Pg extinction event, and the early part of the Paleocene saw the recovery of the Earth from that event. The continents began to take their modern shapes, but most continents (and India) remained separated from each other: Africa and Eurasia were separated by the Tethys Sea, and the Americas were separated by the strait of Panama, as the Isthmus of Panama had not yet formed. This epoch featured a general warming trend, and the earliest modern jungles expanded, eventually reaching the poles. The oceans were dominated by sharks, as the large reptiles that had once ruled had become extinct. Mammals diversified rapidly, but most remained small. The largest tetrapod carnivores during the Paleocene were reptiles, including crocodyliforms, choristoderans, and snakes. Titanoboa, the largest known snake, lived in South America during the Paleocene.

The Eocene Epoch ranged from 56 million to 34 million years ago. In the early Eocene, most land mammals were small and living in cramped jungles, much like the Paleocene. Among them were early primates, whales and horses along with many other early forms of mammals. The climate was warm and humid, with little temperature gradient from pole to pole. In the Middle Eocene Epoch, the circum-Antarctic current between Australia and Antarctica formed, disrupting ocean currents worldwide, resulting in global cooling, and causing the jungles to shrink. More modern forms of mammals continued to diversify with the cooling climate even as more archaic forms died out. By the end of the Eocene, whales such as Basilosaurus had become fully aquatic. The late Eocene Epoch saw the rebirth of seasons, which caused the expansion of savanna-like areas with the earliest substantial grasslands. At the transition between the Eocene and Oligocene epochs there was a significant extinction event, the cause of which is debated.

The Oligocene Epoch spans from 34 million to 23 million years ago. The Oligocene was an important transitional period between the tropical world of the Eocene and more modern ecosystems. This period featured a global expansion of grass which led to many new species taking advantage, including the first elephants, cats, dogs, marsupials and many other species still prevalent today. Many other species of plants evolved during this epoch also, such as the evergreen trees. The long term cooling continued and seasonal rain patterns established. Mammals continued to grow larger. Paraceratherium, one of the largest land mammals to ever live, evolved during this epoch, along with many other perissodactyls.

Neogene Period

The Neogene spans from 23.03 million to 2.58 million years ago. It features two epochs: the Miocene and the Pliocene.

The Miocene spans from 23.03 million to 5.333 million years ago and is a period in which grass spread further across, effectively dominating a large portion of the world, diminishing forests in the process. Kelp forests evolved, leading to the evolution of new species, such as sea otters. During this time, perissodactyls thrived, and evolved into many different varieties. Alongside them were the apes, which evolved into 30 species. Overall, arid and mountainous land dominated most of the world, as did grazers. The Tethys Sea finally closed with the creation of the Arabian Peninsula and in its wake left the Black, Red, Mediterranean and Caspian Seas. This only increased aridity. Many new plants evolved, and 95% of modern seed plants evolved in the mid-Miocene.

The Pliocene lasted from 5.333 million to 2.58 million years ago. The Pliocene featured dramatic climatic changes, which ultimately led to modern species and plants. The Mediterranean Sea dried up for hundreds of thousand years in the Messinian salinity crisis. Along with these major geological events, Africa saw the appearance of Australopithecus, the ancestor of Homo. The isthmus of Panama formed, and animals migrated between North and South America, wreaking havoc on the local ecology. Climatic changes brought savannas that are still continuing to spread across the world, Indian monsoons, deserts in East Asia, and the beginnings of the Sahara desert. The Earth's continents and seas moved into their present shapes. The world map has not changed much since, save for changes brought about by the glaciations of the Quaternary, such as the Great Lakes.

Quaternary Period

The Quaternary spans from 2.58 million years ago to present day, and is the shortest geological period in the Phanerozoic Eon. It features modern animals, and dramatic changes in the climate. It is divided into two epochs: the Pleistocene and the Holocene.

The Pleistocene lasted from 2.58 million to 11,700 years ago. This epoch was marked by a series of glacial periods (ice ages) as a result of the cooling trend that started in the Mid-Eocene. There were numerous separate glaciation periods marked by the advance of ice caps as far south as 40 degrees N latitude in mountainous areas. Meanwhile, Africa experienced a trend of desiccation which resulted in the creation of the Sahara, Namib, and Kalahari deserts. Mammoths, giant ground sloths, dire wolves, sabre-toothed cats, and humans were common and widespread during the Pleistocene. As the Pleistocene drew to a close, a major extinction wiped out much of the world's megafauna, including non-Homo sapiens human species such as Homo neanderthalensis. All the continents were affected, but Africa was impacted to a lesser extent. That continent retained many large animals, such as elephants, rhinos, and hippos. The extent to which Homo Sapiens were involved in this extinction is debated.

The Holocene began 11,700 years ago and lasts until the present day. All recorded history and "Human history" lies within the boundaries of the Holocene epoch. Human activity is blamed for an ongoing mass extinction that began roughly 10,000 years ago, though the species becoming extinct have only been recorded since the Industrial Revolution. This is sometimes referred to as the "Sixth Extinction". Hundreds of species have become extinct due to human activity since the Industrial Revolution.

Biodiversity

It has been demonstrated that changes in biodiversity through the Phanerozoic correlate much better with the hyperbolic model (widely used in demography and macrosociology) than with exponential and logistic models (traditionally used in population biology and extensively applied to fossil biodiversity as well). The latter models imply that changes in diversity are guided by a first-order positive feedback (more ancestors, more descendants) or a negative feedback that arises from resource limitation, or both. The hyperbolic model implies a second-order positive feedback. The hyperbolic pattern of the human population growth arises from quadratic positive feedback, caused by the interaction of the population size and the rate of technological growth. The character of biodiversity growth in the Phanerozoic Eon can be similarly accounted for by a feedback between the diversity and community structure complexity. It has been suggested that the similarity between the curves of biodiversity and human population probably comes from the fact that both are derived from the superposition on the hyperbolic trend of cyclical and random dynamics.

See also

Citations

General references

External links

 Phanerozoic (chronostratigraphy scale)